Clupea is a genus of true herrings.

Clupea may also refer to:

 FRV Clupea, Scottish inshore fisheries research vessel
 Kelibia, coastal town in northeastern Tunisia known in Roman times as Clupea